Trans World Airlines (TWA) was a major American airline which operated from 1930 until 2001. It was formed as Transcontinental & Western Air to operate a route from New York City to Los Angeles via St. Louis, Kansas City, and other stops, with Ford Trimotors. With American, United, and Eastern, it was one of the "Big Four" domestic airlines in the United States formed by the Spoils Conference of 1930.

Howard Hughes acquired control of TWA in 1939, and after World War II led the expansion of the airline to serve Europe, the Middle East, and Asia, making TWA a second unofficial flag carrier of the United States after Pan Am. Hughes gave up control in the 1960s, and the new management of TWA acquired Hilton International and Century 21 in an attempt to diversify the company's business.

As the Airline Deregulation Act of 1978 led to a wave of airline failures, start-ups, and takeovers in the United States, TWA was spun off from its holding company in 1984. Carl Icahn acquired control of TWA and took the company private in a leveraged buyout in 1988. TWA became saddled with debt, sold its London routes, underwent Chapter 11 restructuring in 1992 and 1995, and was further stressed by the explosion of TWA Flight 800 in 1996.

TWA was headquartered at one time in Kansas City, Missouri, and planned to make Kansas City International Airport its main domestic and international hub, but abandoned this plan in the 1970s. The airline later developed its largest hub at St. Louis Lambert International Airport. Its main transatlantic hub was the TWA Flight Center at John F. Kennedy International Airport in New York City, an architectural icon designed by Eero Saarinen, and completed in 1962.

In January 2001, TWA filed for a third and final bankruptcy and was acquired by American Airlines. American laid off many former TWA employees in the wake of the September 11, 2001, attacks. TWA continued to exist as an LLC under American Airlines until July 1, 2003. American Airlines closed the St. Louis hub later that year.

History

1930s

Founding: TWA

TWA's corporate history dates from July 16, 1930, and the forced merger of Transcontinental Air Transport (TAT), Western Air Express (WAE), Maddux Air Lines, Standard, and Pittsburgh Aviation Industries Corporation (PAIC) to form Transcontinental & Western Air (T&WA) on 1 Oct. 1930. The companies merged at the urging of Postmaster General Walter Folger Brown, who was looking for bigger airlines to give airmail contracts to.

The airline brought high-profile aviation pioneers who would give the airline the panache of being called "The Airman's Airline". TAT had the marquee expertise of Charles Lindbergh and was already offering a 48-hour combination of plane and train trips across the United States. WAE had the expertise of Jack Frye. TWA became known as "The Lindbergh Line", with the "Shortest Route Coast to Coast".

On October 25, 1930, the airline offered one of the first all-plane scheduled services from coast to coast. The route took 36 hours, which included an overnight stay in Kansas City. In summer 1931, TWA moved its headquarters from New York to Kansas City, Missouri.

DC-1, DC-2 and DC-3 

On March 31, 1931, the airline suffered after the 1931 Transcontinental & Western Air Fokker F-10 crash near Matfield Green, Kansas. The crash killed all eight on board, including University of Notre Dame football coach Knute Rockne. The cause of the crash was linked to the wooden wings, one of which failed in flight. As a consequence, all of the airline's Fokker F.10s were grounded and later scrapped. TWA needed a replacement aircraft, but the first sixty modern all-metal Boeing 247s were promised to Boeing's sister company United Airlines (both were subsidiaries of United Aircraft and Transport Corporation). TWA was forced to sponsor the development of a new airplane design. Specifications included the ability to fly the high altitude route between Winslow, Arizona, and Albuquerque, New Mexico, with one engine inoperative. Other specifications included the capacity to carry 12 passengers and a range of 1,080 miles.

On September 20, 1932, the development contract was signed with Douglas Aircraft Company and the Douglas DC-1 was delivered to TWA in December 1933, the sole example of its type. On February 18, 1934, Frye (pilot) and Eastern Air Lines' head Eddie Rickenbacker (co-pilot), flew the DC-1 from Glendale, California, to Newark, New Jersey, setting a transcontinental record of 13 hours and 4 minutes. On April 17, Frye was elected president of TWA. Throughout 1934, Tommy Tomlinson set further load and distance records with the DC-1. At the same time, TWA used its Northrop Gamma as an "experimental Overweather Laboratory", in a desire to fly at altitudes above the weather.

The DC-1 was followed by the delivery of 32 Douglas DC-2s that started operations in May 1934 on TWA's Columbus–Pittsburgh–Newark route. Most were phased out by 1937 as the Douglas DC-3 started service, but several DC-2s would be operational through the early years of World War II. TWA started using the DC-3 on June 1, 1937. The fleet included ten DST sleeper aircraft and eight standard DC-3 day versions.

Airmail and Hughes

In 1934, following charges of favoritism in the contracts, the Air Mail scandal erupted, leading to the Air Mail Act of 1934, which dissolved the forced Transcontinental/Western merger and ordered the United States Army Air Service to deliver the mail. However, Transcontinental opted to retain the T&WA name. With the company facing financial hardship, Lehman Brothers and John D. Hertz took over ownership of the company. The Army fliers had a series of crashes, and it was decided to privatize the delivery with the provision that no former companies could bid on the contracts. T&WA added the suffix "Inc." to its name, thus qualifying it as a different company. It was awarded 60% of its old contracts back in May 1934, and won back the rest within a few years.

On January 29, 1937, TWA contracted with Boeing for five Boeing 307 Stratoliners, which included a pressurized cabin. However, the TWA board refused to authorize the expenditure. Frye then approached another flying enthusiast, Howard Hughes, along with Algur H. Meadows and his business partner Henry W. Peters, to buy stock in 1937. Hughes Tool Company purchased 99,293 shares at $8.25 a share, giving Hughes control, and Noah Dietrich was also placed on the board. Later, Hughes bought another $1,500,000 worth of stock. Paul E. Richter became executive vice president in 1938. A new order for five Stratoliners was placed on September 23, 1939, the first Stratoliner was delivered on May 6, 1940, and TWA initiated coast-to-coast flights on July 8, 1940. The planes could carry 16-night passengers in berths, or 33-day passengers. The cabin was pressurized at 12,000 feet, enabling it to fly at an altitude of 20,000 feet, above much of the weather.

1940s

World War II
TWA contracted its five Stratoliners to the Army Air Force's Air Transport Command after Pearl Harbor. Designated as C-75s, they flew 3000 transatlantic flights to Africa and Europe. TWA also contracted to fly its C-54s and Lockheed C-69 Constellations. Hughes and TWA had developed the Constellation in secret with Lockheed, and Hughes purchased 40 for TWA's use in 1939, through his Hughes Tool Company. On April 17, 1944, Hughes and Frye flew the TWA Constellation from Burbank, California, to Washington, D.C., in 6 hours 58 minutes. By war's end, 20 Constellations had been built.

Post-war: The Trans World Airline
TWA had 10 Constellations by the end of 1945 and acquired international routes. TWA inaugurated its New York to Paris route on February 5, 1946, with the Star of Paris. The Italy route was initiated on 2 April and then extended to Cairo. Hughes flew the Star of California from Los Angeles to New York on February 15, 1946, in 8 hours and 38 minutes. Hollywood passengers included Cary Grant, Myrna Loy, William Powell, Frank Morgan, Walter Pidgeon, Tyrone Power, Edward G. Robinson. Hence TWA's reputation as the "airline of the stars".

On October 21, 1946, TWA pilots went on strike. The strike finally ended when TWA and the pilots union agreed to binding arbitration on November 15, 1946. Additionally, TWA lost $14.5 million in 1946, owed $4.34 million in short-term debt and $38.9 million in long-term debt. Yet Hughes opposed Frye's financing proposals.

Falling out between Hughes and Frye
Frye and Hughes had a falling out in 1947. Hughes's financial advisor Noah Dietrich wrote that "Frye's inept handling of costs, his inefficient operations, his extravagance with new purchases of equipment, all these factors combined to nosedive the TWA stock from 71 at the war's end to 9 in 1947". The airline was losing $20,000,000 a year, was in danger of not being able to acquire fuel for its planes due to being deeply indebted to oil companies, and the pilot's union went on strike. Hughes provided $10,000,000 worth of financing, which was later converted to 1,039,000 shares, Frye was removed, and Hughes added 11 members to the board, giving him control. Thus ended the era of "The Airline Run by Flyers".

LaMotte Cohu took over as president, and TWA ordered 12 Lockheed L-749 Constellations on October 18, 1947. Cohu was replaced by Ralph Damon in 1948. As president of American Airlines (AAL), Damon was a proponent of AAL being in the transatlantic market. Damon approved the mergers of AAL and American Export in 1945 to form American Overseas Airlines (AOA). When C.R. Smith sold AOA to Pan American, Damon became disillusioned with AAL. As a consequence, Hughes was able to hire Damon to run TWA. Damon described air transportation as "a race between technology and bankruptcy." Over the next 7 years, Damon introduced practices within the industry that became standard, such as multi-class service with first class and economy class. Damon also brought financial stability by eliminating the company deficit, which was reflected in the stock price rising into the 60s. Carter L. Burgess then took over in 1957, but lasted less than a year, unable to work with Hughes' meddling.

On May 31, 1949, TWA ordered 20 Lockheed 749As. They were operated by TWA for the next 17 years.

1950s: Trans World Airlines
On February 22, 1950, TWA signed a contract with the Glenn L. Martin Company for 12 Martin 2-0-2s and 30 Martin 4-0-4s. The first plane was delivered on July 14, 1950. TWA's Martin fleet was eventually increased to 53 planes, and they remained operational until 1961. On May 17, 1950, the airline officially changed its name to Trans World Airlines. On December 5, 1950, TWA ordered 10 Lockheed L-1049 Super Constellations, which were delivered in 1952. On October 19, 1953, TWA offered nonstop transcontinental service.

TWA's flight operations were based at Kansas City Municipal Airport, while their overhaul base was located at Fairfax Airport.

On July 10, 1953, TWA ordered 20 Lockheed 1049Es, which was later changed to be 1049Gs. They were put in service on April 1, 1955. On September 25, TWA introduced multiple class service, first and economy. On October 30, they inaugurated their Los Angeles to London route, via New York.

On December 23, 1954, the Hughes Tool Co. ordered 25 Lockheed L-1449 turboprops. On March 29, 1955, this order was changed to piston-powered L-1649As. Hughes transferred the planes to TWA in 1956, after receiving Civil Aeronautics Board approval. The first L-1649A was delivered on May 4, 1957. Fully reclining seats were later added to the airliner.

In February 1956, Hughes Tool Co. placed an order with Pratt & Whitney for 300 jet engines, JT-3s and JT-4s. On March 2, 1956, Hughes Tool Co. placed an order for 8 domestic Boeing 707s, later increased to 15 aircraft on January 10, 1957, and an order for 18 international 707s on 19 March 1956, bringing the total order with Boeing to 33 jet planes. Then on June 7, 1956, Hughes placed an order for 30 Convair 880 Skylarks. TWA suffered from its late entry to the jet age, and Hughes' 1956 order cost $497 million. The transaction ultimately resulted in Hughes losing control of the airline.

In 1958, TWA became the first major airline to hire an African American flight attendant, hiring Margaret Grant after another African American woman, Dorothy Franklin of Astoria, Queens, New York, filed a lawsuit alleging "that she had been discriminated against 'because of poor complexion ... unattractive teeth' and legs that were 'not shapely.'" New York governor W. Averell Harriman praised her hiring, saying the action "would raise American prestige abroad".

Charles Sparks Thomas became president on July 2, 1958. The inaugural flight of TWA's Boeing 707 took place on March 20, 1959.

1960s
In 1961, TWA introduced in-flight movies. In 1962, TWA started using Doppler radar on its international flights.

Charles C. Tillinghast Jr.

In 1960, Hughes relinquished control of the airline, as the major stockholder, through the financial terms associated with the jet purchase. As a consequence of that deal, Charles C. Tillinghast Jr. took over as president. The battle over Hughes' control continued in court until 1966 when Hughes was forced to sell his stock. That sale brought Hughes $546,549,771.

Under a plan put together by Dillon, Read & Co., a $165 million loan was raised to fund a 45-jet fleet. The deal which was signed on December 30, 1960, by Hughes' lawyer Raymond Holliday, who constituted one member of a three-person voting trust, the other two members, Ernest R. Breech and Irving S. Olds, represented the financing institutions. On June 30, 1961, TWA filed a federal suit against Hughes, Hughes Tool Co., and Raymond Holliday. Then on April 18, 1962, TWA filed a Delaware suit against Hughes and Hughes Tool Co. On January 10, 1973, the U.S. Supreme Court ruled against TWA in the federal case. However, on May 15, 1986, Delaware ruled in favor of TWA for the state case, eventually awarding TWA $48,346,000.

TWA started operating its Convair 880s on January 12, 1961, but would report a net loss of $38.7 million for 1961. Yet, by 1963, TWA reported a net profit of $19.8 million in 1963, $37 million in 1964, and $50.1 million in 1965. TWA stock went from $7.5 per share in 1962 to $62 in 1965.

Under new management, the Trans World Corporation (TWA's holding company) expanded to purchase Hilton Hotels, Hardee's, Canteen Corp., and Century 21 Realty. Employment grew to nearly 10,000 employees. In 1964, TWA started a program to assist in the United States' export expansion effort that became known as the TWA MarketAir Corporate Logo to promote business passenger air travel and as a marketing tool to be used in air cargo sales. This marketing effort was initiated by the Senior Vice President, Marketing, Thomas B. McFadden, in collaboration with the Bureau of International Commerce, important U.S. financial institutions, and export expansion entities to offer tools that small and medium-sized U.S. companies could use at low or no cost to expand their exports. Staff management of this program was under the direction of Joseph S. Cooper. A key element of this program was the MarketAir Newsletter in a number of languages targeted to American exporters and international travelers.

In 1964, TWA opened its New York office.

Revolutionary airport design
TWA was one of the first airlines, after Delta Air Lines, to embrace the spoke-hub distribution paradigm and was one of the first with the Boeing 747. It planned to use the 747 along with the supersonic transport to whisk people between the West/Midwest (via Kansas City) and New York City (via John F. Kennedy International Airport) to Europe and other world destinations. As part of this strategy, TWA's hub airports were to have gates close to the street. The TWA-style airport design proved impractical when hijackings to Cuba in the late 1960s caused a need for central security checkpoints.

John F. Kennedy International Airport

In 1962, TWA opened Trans World Flight Center, now Terminal 5 (or simply T5), at New York City's JFK Airport and designed by Eero Saarinen. The terminal was expanded in 1969 to accommodate jumbo jets, went dormant in 2001, and underwent renovation and expansion beginning in 2005. A new terminal with a crescent-shaped entry hall and now serving JetBlue opened in 2008—partially encircling the landmark. The headhouse was renovated by Morse Development along with MCR and turned into the TWA Hotel which opened on May 15, 2019.

Kansas City International Airport
Kansas City approved a $150 million bond issue for the TWA hub there. TWA vetoed plans for a Dulles International Airport–style hub-and-spoke gate structure. Following union strife, the airport ultimately cost $250 million when it opened in 1972, with Vice President Spiro Agnew officiating. TWA's gates, which were intended to be within  of the street, became obsolete because of security issues. Kansas City refused to rebuild its terminals as Dallas/Fort Worth International Airport rebuilt its similar terminals, forcing TWA to look for a new hub. Missouri politicians moved to keep it in the state and, in 1982, TWA began a decade-long move to Lambert International Airport in St. Louis.

All-jet fleet

On April 7, 1967, TWA became one of the US's first all-jet airlines with the retirement of their last Lockheed L-749A Constellation and L-1649 Starliner cargo aircraft. That morning, throughout the TWA system, aircraft ground-service personnel placed a booklet on every passenger seat titled "Props Are For Boats".

In 1967–72, TWA was the world's third-largest airline by passenger-miles, behind Aeroflot and United. During the mid and late 1960s, the airline extended its reach as far east as Hong Kong from Europe and also introduced service to a number of destinations in Africa. In 1969, TWA carried the most transatlantic passengers of any airline; until then, Pan American World Airways had always been number one. In the Transpacific Route Case of 1969, TWA was given authority to fly across the Pacific to Hawaii and Taiwan, and for a few years, TWA had a round-the-world network.

In 1969, TWA opened the Breech Academy on a  campus in the Kansas City suburb of Overland Park, Kansas, to train its flight attendants, ticket agents, and travel agents, as well as to provide flight simulators for its pilots. It became the definitive airline facility, training other airlines' staff, as well as its own.

The airline continued to expand European operations in the 1960s, 1970s, and 1980s. In 1987, TWA had a transatlantic system reaching from Los Angeles to Bombay, including virtually every major European population center, with 10 American gateways.

1970s
TWA introduced the Boeing 747 to its fleet in 1970. After the merger with Hilton International in 1967, TWA's holding company, Trans World Corp., continued to diversify, buying Canteen Corp. in 1973, and then the Hardee's restaurant franchises. Financial woes in 1973 included a flight attendants strike, higher fuel prices after the Arab Oil Embargo, and airline deregulation.

In 1975, Trans World Airlines was headquartered in Turtle Bay, in Midtown Manhattan.

The uniforms for the flight attendants during this decade went through three different designers. From 1971–1974, the official TWA uniform was designed by Valentino. From 1974–1978, the official TWA uniform was designed by Stan Herman, and from 1978–2001, the official TWA uniform was designed by Ralph Lauren.

1980s

Facing the pressures of deregulation, the airline consolidated its route system around a domestic hub in St. Louis, aided by its purchase of Ozark Air Lines in 1986, and an international gateway in New York. It was able to remain profitable during this time because of its good route positioning and the relatively low costs of adapting its operations.

In 1983, Trans World Corporation spun off the airline. In 1985, TWA's board agreed to sell the airline to Frank Lorenzo's Texas Air Corporation. Due to Texas Air's ownership of non-union carriers Continental Airlines and New York Air, as well as Lorenzo's reputation of being a 'union buster', TWA's unions objected to the sale, and instead supported a takeover deal from Carl Icahn by offering concessions on condition that Icahn's deal be accepted by the board. Directors subsequently agreed, and the Texas Air deal was scrapped. Following the sale, Icahn appointed himself as chairman of the airline.

Also in 1985, TWA closed its hub at Pittsburgh International Airport after nearly 20 years as a hub. The following year, TWA acquired Ozark Air Lines, a regional carrier based at Lambert-St. Louis International Airport, for $250 million. This transaction increased TWA's share of enplanements in St. Louis from 56.6% to 82%.

TWA had pilot bases in many European cities such as Berlin, Frankfurt, Zurich, Rome, and Athens. These bases were used to provide crews for the Boeing 727s which TWA operated in its European route network. Its Boeing 727 aircraft served Cairo, Athens, Rome, London, Paris, Geneva, Berlin, Frankfurt, Hamburg, Stuttgart, Zurich, Amsterdam, Oslo, Vienna, and Istanbul.

In 1987, Icahn moved the company's main offices from Manhattan, to office buildings he owned in Mount Kisco.

TWA earned a profit of $106.2 million in 1987. In September 1988, TWA stockholders approved a privatization plan, winning Icahn $469 million in personal profit, but adding $539.7 million in debt to TWA.

TWA's zenith occurred in the summer of 1988, when, for the only time, the airline carried more than 50 percent of all transatlantic passengers. Every day, Boeing 747, Lockheed L-1011, and Boeing 767 aircraft departed to more than 30 cities in Europe, fed by a small but effective domestic operation focused on moving U.S. passengers to New York or other gateway cities for wide-body service across the Atlantic, while a similar inter-European operation shuttled non-U.S. passengers to TWA's European gateways—London, Paris (which was even considered a European hub by TWA), and Frankfurt—for travel to the United States.

In 1989, TWA decided to replace its fleet of Boeing 727 Series 100 aircraft with the former Ozark Airlines DC-9s. This decision was based on the economics of operating three-crew airplanes (727s) with three engines, versus operating two-crew airplanes (DC-9s) with two engines. Both airplanes had about the same passenger and cargo capacity, so it was decided to replace the Boeing fleet. To prepare for this transition, TWA positioned several million dollars worth of spare parts for the DC-9s in Germany. This was a requirement dictated by the German government. If TWA wanted to use DC-9s in the service of the German population, then TWA had to provide readily available spare parts for its fleet. The airline also sent its senior DC-9 pilots (known as Check Airmen) to Europe to observe the operations in preparation for the changeover of the crews that was to follow. Shortly before the DC-9 airplanes began arriving in Germany, however, the entire plan was cancelled because the leasing contracts that Carl Icahn had created for the former Ozark DC-9s specifically forbade any operations outside the continental limits of the United States.

1990s
In 1990, Icahn's pressing needs for additional capital forced him to sell the airline's Heathrow operations to American Airlines about the same time that Pan American World Airways sold its Heathrow operation to United.

1992 bankruptcy
Tillinghast ignored the transpacific market and the dedicated air cargo market. He was reported to have said, "There's no money in the Pacific and there's no money in cargo. We're gonna' shrink this airline 'til it's profitable." These two oversights are said to have been the undoing of TWA, in addition to Sandro Andretta's resignation in December 1991.

Airline deregulation hit TWA hard in the 1980s. TWA had badly neglected domestic U.S. expansion at a time when the newly deregulated domestic market was growing quickly. TWA's holding company, Trans World Corporation, spun off the airline, which then became starved for capital. The airline briefly considered selling itself to renowned corporate raider Frank Lorenzo in the 1980s, but ended up selling to yet another corporate raider, Carl Icahn, in 1985. Under Icahn's direction, many of its most profitable assets were sold to competitors, much to the detriment of TWA. Icahn was eventually ousted in 1993, though not before the airline was forced to file for bankruptcy on January 31, 1992.

Negotiations continued until a deal was reached on 24 Aug. 1992. In that deal, Icahn had to pay TWA $150 million, the employees reduced compensation by 15% over the next three years, and the creditors forgave $1 billion in debt. When TWA emerged from bankruptcy in Nov. 1993, employees owned 45% of the company. Jeffrey H. Erickson took over as president in 1994, moved its headquarters to St. Louis, and sponsored the Trans World Dome.

1995 bankruptcy
When Carl Icahn left in 1993, he arranged to have TWA give Karabu Corp., an entity he controlled, the rights to buy TWA tickets at 45% off published fares through September 2003. This was named "the Karabu deal". The ticket program agreement, which began on June 14, 1995, excluded tickets for travel which originated or terminated in St. Louis, Missouri. Tickets were subject to TWA's normal seat assignment and boarding pass rules and regulations - they were not assignable to any other carrier and were not endorsable. No commissions were paid to Karabu by TWA for tickets sold under the ticket program agreement.

By agreement dated August 14, 1995, Lowestfare.com LLC, a wholly-owned operating subsidiary of Karabu, was joined as a party to the ticket program agreement. Pursuant to the ticket program agreement, Lowestfare.com could purchase an unlimited number of system tickets. System tickets are tickets for all applicable classes of service which were purchased by Karabu from TWA at a 45% discount from TWA's published fare. In addition to system tickets, Lowestfare.com could also purchase domestic consolidator tickets, which are tickets issued at bulk fare rates and were limited to specified origin/destination city markets and did not permit the holder to modify or refund a purchased ticket. Karabu's purchase of domestic consolidator tickets was subject to a cap of $70 million per year based on the full retail price of the tickets.

On most TWA flights, Karabu could buy at a heavy discount and then sell a certain portion of all TWA's available seats. As a result, TWA was hamstrung by the high proportion of heavily discounted seats that had been sold and was essentially left with no control over its own pricing. It could not afford to discount any of its own seats, and if TWA wanted to increase revenue on busy routes by putting a larger plane into service, Karabu would only claim more seats. TWA was losing an estimated $150 million a year in revenue due to this deal.

To ameliorate the Karabu deal, TWA went in and out of bankruptcy in 1995.

TWA entered its second bankruptcy on June 30, 1995. When TWA emerged in August 1995, employee ownership was reduced to 30%, but the company was relieved of $0.5 billion of its $1.8 billion debt.

Short turn-around

By 1998, TWA had reorganized as a primarily domestic carrier, with routes centered on hubs at St. Louis and New York. Partly in response to TWA Flight 800 and the age of its fleet, TWA announced a major fleet renewal, ordering 125 new aircraft. TWA paid for naming rights for the new Trans World Dome, home of the then St. Louis Rams, in its corporate hometown. In June 1994, its headquarters moved to One City Centre in downtown St. Louis.

TWA's fleet-renewal program included adding newer and smaller, more fuel-efficient, longer-range aircraft such as the Boeing 757 and 767 and short-range aircraft such as the McDonnell Douglas MD-80 and Boeing 717. Aircraft such as the Boeing 727 and 747, along with the Lockheed L-1011 and older DC-9s, some from Ozark and the 1960s, were retired. TWA also became one of the early customers for the Airbus A318 through International Lease Finance Corporation. TWA, had it continued operating through 2003, would have been the first U.S. carrier to fly the type.

TWA had international code-share agreements with Royal Jordanian Airlines, Kuwait Airways, Royal Air Maroc, Air Europa, and Air Malta. In 1997, a code-share agreement was signed with Air Ukraine with plans to begin service between Paris and Kyiv by 1999. Domestic code-share with America West Airlines was started, with long-term plans for a merger considered.

The airlines' routes were also changed; several international destinations were dropped or changed. The focus of the airline became domestic with a few international routes through its St. Louis hub and smaller New York (JFK) and San Juan, Puerto Rico hubs. Domestically, the carrier improved services with redesigned aircraft and new services, including "Pay in Coach, Fly in First", whereby coach passengers could be upgraded to first class when flying through St. Louis. Internationally, services were cut. European destinations eventually were limited to London and Paris; and in the Middle East, to Cairo, Riyadh and Tel Aviv.

2000s

TWA stated that it planned to make Los Angeles a focus city around October 2000, with a partnership with American Eagle Airlines as part of Trans World Connection.

Acquisition by American Airlines
Financial problems soon resurfaced and Trans World Airlines Inc. assets were acquired in April 2001 by AMR Corp., the parent company of American Airlines, which quickly formed a new company called TWA Airlines LLC. As part of the deal, TWA declared Chapter 11 bankruptcy (for the third time) the day after it agreed to the purchase. The terms of the deal included a $745 million payment. The bankruptcy court approved the purchase over a rival bid by Jet Acquisition Group, an investment group fronted by Ralph Atkin, founder of SkyWest Airlines. The total value of TWA's assets and assumed liabilities was estimated to be $2 billion. American did not claim the naming rights for the Rams' home, which eventually became the Edward Jones Dome and later The Dome at America's Center.

TWA booking ended on November 30, 2001.

TWA Airlines LLC flew its last flight on December 1, 2001, with an MD-83 aircraft painted in a special inverted livery named "Wings of Pride" (N948TW). The ceremonial last flight was Flight 220 from Kansas City to St. Louis, with CEO Captain William Compton at the controls. The final flight before TWA was 'officially' absorbed by American Airlines was completed between St. Louis and Las Vegas, Nevada, also on December 1, 2001. At 10:00 pm CST on that date, employees began removing all TWA signs and placards from airports around the country, replacing them with American Airlines signs. At midnight, all TWA flights officially became listed as American Airlines flights. Some aircraft carried hybrid American/TWA livery during the transition, with American's tricolor stripe on the fuselage and TWA titles on the tail and forward fuselage. Signage still bears the TWA logo in portions of Concourse D at Lambert St. Louis International Airport.

American Airlines acquired some Ambassadors Clubs; other Ambassadors Clubs closed on December 2, 2001.

TWA's St. Louis hub shrank after the acquisition, due to its proximity to American's larger hub at Chicago's O'Hare International Airport. As a result, American initially replaced TWA's St. Louis mainline hub with regional jet service (going from over 800 operations a day to just over 200) and downsized TWA's maintenance base in Kansas City. In September 2009, American Airlines announced its intent to shut down the St. Louis hub it inherited from TWA and, in October 2009, American Airlines announced its intent to close the Kansas City maintenance base by September 2010.

Ongoing heritage

On December 16, 2013, Doug Parker, CEO of American Airlines Group, announced that TWA heritage aircraft would be added in the future, "We will continue that tradition at American, including introducing a TWA aircraft in the future and keeping a US Airways livery aircraft. That also means we will keep a heritage American livery in the fleet". On November 16, 2015, American painted a 737-823 in the TWA livery (with American titles, as shown to the right). The last of the TWA MD-83s stayed in service until September 2019. This was the last Trans World Airlines, Inc. aircraft in the American Airlines fleet.

An original lighted TWA sign still exists (as of 2019) on the east side of Saarinen's TWA Flight Center terminal facing JetBlue's Terminal 5. This sign has been incorporated by the TWA Hotel as part of their use of the TWA Flight Center building.

On May 15, 2019, the TWA Hotel opened in the Flight Center's headhouse, after four years of restoration work that began in 2015. In addition to replacing and repairing much of the infrastructure of the building, additional buildings were constructed to house the hotel rooms, with the Flight Center's interior being used for the lobby, restaurants and exhibition facilities. In addition, a vintage Lockheed Constellation L-1649 Starliner was acquired and fully restored for use as the hotel's cocktail bar, being placed on a section of apron in front of the hotel.

Destinations
 For commuter destinations, see Trans World Express and Trans World Connection.

TWA had codeshare agreements with the following airlines:
 Air Europa
 Air Malta
 America West Airlines
 American Airlines
 Kuwait Airways
 Royal Air Maroc
 Royal Jordanian

Fleet

Final fleet
When Trans World Airlines was acquired by American Airlines in 2001, their fleet contained these aircraft:

Retired fleet
Trans World Airlines had previously operated the following aircraft:

TWA, at one time, also held orders for the BAC-Aérospatiale Concorde, Sud Aviation Caravelle, Boeing 2707, and the Airbus A330-300. The remaining A330 orders were eventually converted to A318 orders. TWA, along with Southwest Airlines and USAir, are the only major U.S.-based airlines to never have operated the McDonnell Douglas DC-10.

Fleet in 1970

Accidents and incidents

Since 1942, TWA was involved in 84 incidents.

One of the first to gain wide press coverage was the crash of NC1946 (a DC-3), operating as Flight 3, which killed Hollywood film star Carole Lombard, her mother, and 20 others.

On July 11, 1946, a TWA Lockheed Constellation, NC86513, operating as TWA Flight 513, a training flight, crashed in Reading, Pennsylvania. Of six crew members, only one survived. The crash was caused by a fire in the cargo hold and grounded all Constellations from July 12 until August 23, 1946.

Another disaster that gained widespread coverage was the collision of a TWA Lockheed L-1049 Super Constellation with a United Airlines' Douglas DC-7 over the Grand Canyon in 1956, which killed all 128 people on board both airliners. This accident led to groundbreaking changes in the regulation of flight operations in the United States.

A similar event occurred in 1960, this time in New York City, when another TWA L-1049 collided with a United Douglas DC-8. The disaster killed 134 people: 84 on board the UAL DC-8, 44 on board the TWA L-1049, and six people on the ground. No one survived from either airliner.

On June 26, 1959, a TWA Lockheed L-1649 Starliner, N7313C, operating as TWA Flight 891, crashed in a violent thunderstorm after it departed from Malpensa Airport, some 30 miles north of Milan, at 16.20. The aircraft was struck by lightning while flying at 11,000 feet above the ground, disintegrated with a tremendous explosion, burst into flames and crashed in several charred parts scattered over an area of five miles

Terrorist target

From 1969 to 1986, six TWA airliners were terrorist targets for Palestinian fedayeen, four of which were hijackings and two were bombings, mainly because the airline had a strong European presence, was a flag carrier for the United States, and flew to Israel.
 In 1969, TWA Flight 840 from Rome to Athens was hijacked and forcibly diverted to Damascus. Nobody was injured, but the aircraft's nose was blown up (although replaced and the plane returned to service).
 In 1970, TWA Flight 741 was hijacked after taking off from Frankfurt am Main en route to New York City. It was taken to Dawson's Field in Jordan, along with two other hijacked aircraft. All three aircraft were empty of passengers and crew when they were destroyed. A fourth aircraft landed in Cairo and had a similar fate.
 In 1971, three members of the group "Republic of New Afrika" who had murdered a New Mexico State Police officer on November 8 hijacked TWA Flight 106, a Boeing 727, from Albuquerque to Havana. Passengers were released in Tampa, Florida.
 In 1974, TWA Flight 841 from Tel Aviv to New York City crashed into the Ionian Sea shortly after takeoff from Athens en route to Rome after a bomb believed to have been in the cargo hold exploded, killing all 88 on board.
 In 1976, TWA Flight 355 was hijacked by five Croatian separatists as it flew from New York–LaGuardia to O'Hare International. They ordered the pilot to fly to Montreal, where the plane was refueled, and then made additional refueling stops in Gander and Keflavik; at some of these stops, the hijackers unloaded propaganda pamphlets that they demanded to be dropped over Montreal, Chicago, New York, London, and Paris. At the plane's final stop, Paris–Charles de Gaulle, the hijackers surrendered after direct talks with U.S. Ambassador Kenneth Rush, and their explosives were revealed to be fakes.
 In 1985, TWA Flight 847 from Athens to Rome was hijacked first to Beirut, then to Algiers, back to Beirut, back to Algiers, and finally back to Beirut—with some of its fuel being paid for by the Shell credit card of flight attendant Uli Derickson. United States Navy Petty Officer 2nd Class Robert Stethem was singled out by Hezbollah as a member of the American military. The hijackers beat and tortured Stethem; Mohammed Ali Hammadi murdered the dying sailor and dumped his body on the tarmac. Robert Stethem was awarded the Purple Heart and Bronze Star with burial in Arlington National Cemetery. The memory of Robert Dean Stethem is honored by his nation with a namesake U.S. Navy destroyer, the USS Stethem (DDG-63).
 In 1986, TWA Flight 840, on approach to Athens, Greece, was attacked with an on-board bomb, causing four Americans (including a nine-month-old infant) to be ejected from the aircraft to their deaths. Five others on the aircraft were injured as the cabin experienced a rapid decompression. The remaining 110 passengers survived the incident, and pilot Richard "Pete" Petersen made an emergency landing in Athens.

TWA Flight 800

TWA's worst accident occurred on July 17, 1996, when Flight 800, a Boeing 747 en route to Paris, exploded over the Atlantic Ocean near Long Island, killing all 230 people on board. The National Transportation Safety Board concluded that the most likely cause of the disaster was a center-fuel-tank explosion sparked by exposed wiring. In their subsequent coverage, the media focused heavily on the fact that TWA's airline fleet was among the oldest in service (the 747 used for Flight 800 was manufactured in 1971, making it 25 years old at the time of the incident). The flight was under the command of Captain Steven Snyder, a veteran TWA pilot.

Crew bases
TWA had crew bases in Boston, New York, Washington, D.C., St. Louis, Kansas City, Chicago, San Francisco, Los Angeles, and Frankfurt. International flight attendants' crew bases were located in Paris, Rome, Hong Kong, and, at one time, Cairo. Starting in 1996, TWA had a "West Coast Regional Domicile", in which pilots and flight attendants covered originating flights out of major West Coast U.S. airports from San Diego, California, north to San Francisco.

Ambassadors Club
TWA operated Ambassadors Club locations in various airports. American Airlines acquired some clubs, and other clubs closed on December 2, 2001. Before the closure of the clubs, TWA maintained clubs at:

Clubs in North America open on December 1, 2001

 
 California
 Los Angeles (Los Angeles International Airport) (Converted into Alaska Airlines Board Room)
 San Francisco (San Francisco International Airport) (Converted into Alaska Airlines Board Room)
 Massachusetts
 Boston (Logan International Airport)
 Missouri
 Kansas City (Kansas City International Airport) (Converted into Admirals Club)
 St. Louis (Lambert-St. Louis International Airport) (Converted into Admirals Club)
 New York
 New York City (LaGuardia Airport)
 Virginia
 Washington, D.C., area (Washington Dulles International Airport)

Clubs in North America and the Caribbean closed prior to dissolution

 
 Arizona
 Phoenix (Sky Harbor International Airport)
 California
 (San Diego International Airport)
 New Mexico
 Albuquerque (Albuquerque International Sunport)
 New Jersey
 Newark (Newark Liberty International Airport)
 New York
 New York City (John F. Kennedy International Airport)
 Ohio
 Columbus (Port Columbus International Airport)
 Dayton (Dayton International Airport)
 Texas
 Dallas/Fort Worth (Dallas/Fort Worth International Airport)
 Houston (George Bush Intercontinental Airport)
 Virginia
 Washington, D.C., area (Washington Reagan National Airport)
 Washington
 Seattle-Tacoma International Airport)
 
 San Juan (Luis Muñoz Marín International Airport)

Clubs in Europe closed prior to dissolution

 
 London (London Gatwick Airport)
 
 Paris (Charles de Gaulle Airport)
 
 Milan (Malpensa Airport)
 Rome (Leonardo Da Vinci Airport)
 
 Frankfurt (Frankfurt Airport) (became an American Airlines Admirals Club in 1997)

See also

 
 List of defunct airlines of the United States

References

External links 

 TWA Museum at Charles B. Wheeler Downtown Airport in Kansas City 
 
 US Airways and American Airlines merger site
 American Airlines site
 
 TWA - Trans World Airlines - Transcontinental and Western Air has many TWA timetables from 1931 until 1968, showing where they flew, how long it took and how much it cost.
 Wayback Machine has three TWA timetables including the final TWA timetable.
 TWA History - TWA Official Website
 The karabu deal contract
 Historical TWA aircraft images
 Trans World Airlines records at the University of Wyoming – American Heritage Center
 Digital collection of TWA Skyliner (in-house magazine of TWA) via the State Historical Society of Missouri 
 TWA Retired Pilots Association

 
Airlines disestablished in 2001
Airlines established in 1930
American Airlines
Companies based in Kansas City, Missouri
Companies based in St. Louis
Companies that filed for Chapter 11 bankruptcy in 1992
Companies that filed for Chapter 11 bankruptcy in 1995
Companies that filed for Chapter 11 bankruptcy in 2001
Defunct airlines of the United States
Defunct companies based in Missouri
Howard Hughes
Defunct companies based in New York City